Badukuva Daari is a 1966 Indian Kannada-language film, directed by Vedantam Raghavayya and produced by A. S. R. Aanjaneyulu. The film stars Jayalalitha, Kalyan Kumar, Udaykumar and Narasimharaju. The film has musical score by T. Chalapathi Rao. The movie is based on the 1953 Telugu movie Bratuku Teruvu, which went on to be remade in Hindi in 1969 as Jeene Ki Raah.

Cast
Jayalalitha 
Kalyan Kumar
Udaykumar 
Narasimharaju
Balakrishna
Ramesh

Soundtrack
The music was composed by T. Chalapathi Rao.

References

External links
 

1966 films
1960s Kannada-language films
Films scored by T. Chalapathi Rao
Films directed by K. S. Prakash Rao